Edward Dembowski (25 April or 31 May 1822 – 27 February 1846) was a Polish philosopher, literary critic, journalist, and leftist independence activist.

Life
Edward Dembowski was the son of Julia, née Kochanowska, and a conservative castellan-voivode of the Congress Poland, Leon Dembowski.  On account of Edward's szlachta origins and contrasting radical social views, he was called "the red castellan's-son."

Dembowski published Przegląd Naukowy (The Learned Review), a journal for young, independence-minded intelligentsia.

In 1842–43 Dembowski conducted underground revolutionary activities in the Russian-ruled Congress Poland.  Later, being at risk of arrest by Russian authorities, he transferred to Prussian-ruled Greater Poland.

During the 1846 Kraków Uprising, Dembowski was secretary to dictator Jan Tyssowski.  Dembowski died on 27 February 1846 at Podgórze, shot by Austrian troops while leading a procession to conduct agitation among the peasants.

In his philosophical views, Dembowski was a leftist Hegelian.

See also
History of philosophy in Poland
List of Poles

Notes

References
"Dembowski, Edward," Encyklopedia Polski (Encyclopedia of Poland), Kraków, Wydawnictwo Ryszard Kluszczyński, 1996, p. 128.
 Władysław Tatarkiewicz, Zarys dziejów filozofii w Polsce (A Brief History of Philosophy in Poland), [in the series:]  Historia nauki polskiej w monografiach (History of Polish Learning in Monographs), [volume] XXXII, Kraków, Polska Akademia Umiejętności (Polish Academy of Learning), 1948.  This monograph draws from pertinent sections in earlier editions of the author's Historia filozofii (History of Philosophy).
 Leszek Sykulski, Edward Dembowski (1822–1846). Biografia polityczna (Edward Dembowski (1822–1846: A Political Biography), Toruń, Wydawnictwo Naukowe Grado, 2006.
 Obraz literatury polskiej XIX i XX wieku. Seria 3. Literatura krajowa w okresie romantyzmu: 1831-1863 (Polish Literature of the 19th and 20th Centuries. Series 3: Literature in the Romantic Period: 1831–1863), vol. 2.
 Stefan Wolski, "Ballada rycerska" Lublin, 1977. .

1822 births
1846 deaths
19th-century Polish philosophers
Polish literary critics
Polish journalists
Polish rebels
Deaths by firearm in Poland
19th-century journalists
Male journalists
19th-century male writers